Callianthe elegans is a species of flowering plant in the tribe Malveae. It is found in Brazil.

References

External links 
 Callianthe elegans at Tropicos

elegans
Plants described in 2012
Flora of Brazil